Canarium pimela called Chinese black olive is a tree species in the genus Canarium and the family Burseraceae found in Indo-China; in Vietnam it is called trám đen or cà na. The Catalogue of Life does not record any sub-species. Once boiled in salt water the fruit are edible, resembling the flavor of salted plums, and are used in Chinese cuisine as a seasoning.

References

External links
 

pimela
Flora of Indo-China
Trees of Vietnam